"My Love" is a song by Irish boy band Westlife. It was released on 30 October 2000 as the second single from their second studio album, Coast to Coast (2000). The song debuted at number one on the UK Singles Chart, giving the band their seventh UK number one. The song was the 35th best-selling single of 2000 in the UK. It also won The Record of the Year in 2000. It has sold 400,000 copies in the UK.

In South Korea, the single stayed in the top 75 of the Official International Karaoke Charts since the inception of the charts in December 2010 up to its recent chart released. On 12 May 2018, the song was performed on South Korean music programme 'Immortal Songs 2' by Eric Nam. Band member Shane Filan was the featured 'Legend' and judged the participants.

Background
The song was written by Jörgen Elofsson, Per Magnusson, David Kreuger and Pelle Nylén, and it was produced by Magnusson and Kreuger. The song, "My Love" is written in the key of C major, and their vocals span from E4 to A5. The song is said to be inspired by the hit single "Mull of Kintyre" by Wings.

It is the band's eleventh best selling single of all-time on both paid-for and combined sales categories in the UK as of January 2019. It's also their fifth most-streamed single with 1.17 million across video and audio in the United Kingdom as of January 2019. While it is their seventh most streamed song of all time from their home country, the Republic of Ireland, as of 2 April 2019. As of January 2021, this is the most successful and popular single of the band on YouTube.

Music video
The music video was directed by Robert Brinkmann. The opening scene features the band members waiting at Shannon Airport, where Nicky Byrne informs them that the last flight out has just been cancelled. The band members become upset by the news, then Brian McFadden says that it would be "quicker walking" and that he's going. The others follow him and the song begins.

The first stanza takes place inside the airport and during the chorus, the scene shifts to Catherine Street in Limerick City. Harstonge House (or Oznam House as it is also known) on Harstonge Street can clearly be seen in the video as the band members walk down the street. After the end of the first chorus, the scene shifts to Colbert train station in Limerick. Then again during the second chorus, the scene changes to Lahinch Beach in Co. Clare. During the final chorus, the band members sing atop the Cliffs of Moher, Co. Clare.

in April 2017, the video exceeded 100 million views on YouTube, becoming Westlife's first official video ever to get the Vevo Certified. It has reached 311 million views and 1.6 million likes on YouTube (4 November 2022). It is the most-watched video on Westlife's YouTube channel.

Track listings

UK CD1
 "My Love" (radio edit)
 "If I Let You Go" (USA mix)
 Enhanced section

UK CD2
 "My Love" (radio edit)
 "My Love" (instrumental)
 Enhanced section

UK cassette single and European CD single
 "My Love" (radio edit)
 "If I Let You Go" (USA mix)

Australian CD single
 "My Love" (radio edit)
 "If I Let You Go" (USA mix)
 "My Love" (instrumental)
 Enhanced section

Credits and personnel
Credits are adapted from the UK CD1 liner notes.

Recording
 Recorded at Cheiron Studios, Stockholm, Sweden
 Orchestra recorded at Roam Studios, Stockholm, Sweden

Personnel
 Per Magnusson – songwriter, producer, arranger, keyboards, programming
 David Kreuger – songwriter, producer, arranger, programming
 Jörgen Elofsson – songwriter
 Pelle Nylén – songwriter
 Ulf and Erik Jansson – arranger and conductor of Stockholm Session Orchestra
 Björn Norén – orchestra recording
 Bernard Löhr – mixing
 Esbjörn Öhrwall – acoustic & electric guitars
 Thomas Lindberg – bass
 Gustave Lund – percussion
 Åke Sundqvist – percussion
 Joakim Agnas – piccolo trumpet
 Anders von Hofsten – additional backing vocals
 Björn Engelmann – mastering

Charts

Weekly charts

Year-end charts

Certifications and sales

References

External links
 Official Westlife Website

2000 singles
2000 songs
2000s ballads
Bertelsmann Music Group singles
Irish Singles Chart number-one singles
Number-one singles in Scotland
Number-one singles in Sweden
RCA Records singles
Songs written by David Kreuger
Songs written by Jörgen Elofsson
Songs written by Pelle Nylén
Songs written by Per Magnusson
UK Singles Chart number-one singles
Westlife songs